Lalbarra tehsil is a fourth-order administrative and revenue division, a subdivision of third-order administrative and revenue division of Balaghat district of Madhya Pradesh.

Geography
Lalbarra tehsil has an area of 502.62 sq kilometers. It is bounded by Seoni district in the west, northwest and north, Balaghat tehsil in the northeast, east and southeast, Waraseoni tehsil in the south and Katangi tehsil in the southwest. Water for agriculture is provided from the Dhuty Dam.

See also 
Balaghat district

Citations

External links

Tehsils of Madhya Pradesh
Balaghat district